Bulbophyllum purpurascens is a species of orchid in the genus Bulbophyllum in section Cirrhopetalum. Not the most showy of orchids, this orchid bears 10 to 12 flowers on each of its inflorescences. The flowers are pale yellow and are about 1.5 cm long. It is native to Borneo, Indonesia, Malaysia, and Thailand.

References
The Bulbophyllum-Checklist
The Internet Orchid Species Photo Encyclopedia

purpurascens